Nathan Lamar Watts (born March 25, 1954 in Detroit, Michigan, United States) is an American session bassist, best known for his work with Stevie Wonder from the 1970s to the present. He has served as Stevie Wonder's musical director since 1994.

Biography 
Born in Detroit, Nathan Watts started playing the trumpet while he was still in elementary school, inspired by Lee Morgan. Watts was part of a trio that featured other future prominent session musicians Ray Parker Jr. on clarinet and drummer Ollie Brown and frequented Motown's Hitsville Studios to attend rehearsals and recordings of The Funk Brothers, the base-band of the label. When Parker abandoned the clarinet in favor of the guitar, he convinced Watts to switch to bass, which was the first thing that he did after graduating from high school in 1972. With his first instrument, a National Bass, Watts learned "Cold Sweat" by James Brown, and soon began to study the lines of other great bassists such as James Jamerson, Chuck Rainey, and Bob Babbitt. When Ray Parker Jr. joined Marvin Gaye's band, Watts joined a local group called the Final Decision, with the intention of studying accounting, if his career as a musician failed.

In August 1974, Watts received a call to work with Stevie Wonder, in replacement of Reggie McBride, who had joined Rare Earth. At the time, Watts had only been playing bass for two years. After being selected as the official bassist of the band, Watts took part in the Japanese tour of 1975, and then began recording the album Songs in the Key of Life. Watts says throughout his career with Wonder that he recorded bass tracks on many demos that Wonder replaced with his own keyboard bass for the final versions. This method was employed for “Knocks Me Off My Feet″ and ″Isn't She Lovely″. From that moment on, Nathan Watts's career has continued to develop, both alongside Stevie Wonder and with many other artists.

Style and valuation 
Nathan Watts grew up listening to the Funk Brothers as well as other musicians such as Jimi Hendrix, Deep Purple, Rare Earth, Mahogany Rush, and Steppenwolf. In terms of his three main influences as a bassist, Watts lists James Jamerson, Chuck Rainey and Joseph "Lucky" Scott, bassist of Curtis Mayfield.

Technically, his style is characterized by the use of three fingers of the right hand, the strong attack that prints the notes, as well as the frequent use of techniques of palm mute, hammer on, trills and slides. The musician has developed an important career along with Stevie Wonder, with whom he has recorded some songs that would become classics for lovers: "I Wish", "As", "I Ain't Gonna Stand for It" and "Do I Do" are among Watts top favorite bass lines. More than 36 years in the service of Stevie Wonder – along with being the musical director of the band for 12 years – he earned in 2010 the International Bassist Award from the Winter NAMM Show, an award that recognizes the achievements of the musician throughout his career.

Gear 
Nathan Watts has used his 1974 Fender Precision Bass and his 1979 Music Man StingRay as main instruments throughout his career. He has also used a Fender Jazz Bass and Yamaha, Aria, and B.C. Rich (four and five string) bass and Roland G-88. On the road he currently switches between Bossa 4 and 5 string basses for a modern tone. In the studio he uses Alleva-Coppolo basses (a LG-5 Classic Crewes of five strings with and without frets). He also uses Elixir Nanowebs, and Hartke Hydrive amplifiers and LH1000 heads. Before he became an endorser for Hartke, he had previously used a National amplifier and SWR amplifiers.

Discography

With Stevie Wonder 
 1976 – Songs in the Key of Life – Stevie Wonder
 1979 – Journey Through The Secret Life Of Plants – Stevie Wonder
 1980 – Hotter Than July – Stevie Wonder
 1982 – Original Musiquarium I – Stevie Wonder
 1984 – The Woman in Red – Stevie Wonder
 1987 – Characters – Stevie Wonder
 1991 – Jungle Fever – Stevie Wonder
 1995 – Conversation Peace – Stevie Wonder
 1995 – Natural Wonder – Stevie Wonder
 2005 – A Time To Love – Stevie Wonder

Other artists 
 1977 – Funk in a Mason Jar – Harvey Mason
 1977 – Sergio Mendes & the New Brasil '77 – Sergio Mendes
 1977 – Song Bird – Denice Williams
 1977 – The Two of Us – Marilyn McCoo & Billy Davis Jr.
 1977 – Choosing You – Lenny Williams
 1978 – Bish – Stephen Bishop
 1978 – Destiny – The Jacksons
 1978 – Live and Direct – The Mighty Clouds of Joy
 1978 – Love-A-Thon – Vernon Burch
 1978 – Spark of Love – Lenny Williams
 1979 – Bittersweet – Lamont Dozier
 1979 – Changing Times – The Mighty Clouds of Joy
 1979 – Delight – Ronnie Foster
 1979 – Happy People – Paulinho Da Costa
 1979 – Magic Lady – Sergio Mendes
 1979 – On the Other Side – The McCrary's
 1979 – Splendor – Splendor
 1979 – Nightingale – Gilberto Gil
 1979 – Motown Superstar Series, Vol. 1 – Diana Ross
 1980 – Let's Get Serious – Jermaine Jackson
 1980 – 10½ – The Dramatics
 1980 – Eight for the Eighties – Webster Lewis
 1980 – From the Gitgo – Donnie Elbert
 1980 – Jose Feliciano – José Feliciano
 1980 – La Toya Jackson – La Toya Jackson
 1980 – The Longest Road – Seals & Crofts
 1980 – Motown Superstar Series, Vol. 13 – Gladys Knight
 1980 – Special Things – The Pointer Sisters
 1980 – Triumph – The Jacksons
 1981 – Black & White - The Pointer Sisters
 1981 – Give Me Your Love – Sylvia Striplin
 1981 – Motown Superstar Series, Vol. 11 – Martha & the Vandellas
 1981 – The Way I Am – Billy Preston
 1982 – Diana's Duets – Diana Ross
 1982 – Lionel Richie – Lionel Richie
 1982 – Love Conquers All – Michael Wycoff
 1982 – Reunion – The Temptations
 1982 – So Excited – The Pointer Sisters
 1982 – Silk Electric – Diana Ross
 1983 – Baby Sister – June Pointer
 1983 – Best of Reggae Sunsplash, Vol. 2 – VVAA
 1983 – Bet Cha Say That to All the Girls – Sister Sledge
 1983 – Bossa Nova Hotel – Michael Sembello
 1983 – Break Out (Pointer Sisters album) – The Pointer Sisters
 1983 – Robbery – Teena Marie
 1983 – Standing on the One – Jon Gibson
 1983 – Pipes of Peace – Paul McCartney
 1984 – Mwana – Grady Harrell
 1986 – Brasil 88 – Sergio Mendes
 1989 – Come Play with Me – Grady Harrell
 1989 – True Spirit – Ronnie Laws
 1989 – Working Girl – Original Soundtrack
 1990 – Brasil 88: The Sound, The Music – VVAA
 1991 – Force Behind the Power – Diana Ross
 1991 – Live in the Stuffenbau – Bobby Byrd
 1992 – All for Love – Timmy T
 1992 – Do I Ever Cross Your Mind? – George Howard
 1992 – Too Much, Too Little, Too Late – Johnny Mathis
 1993 – Contemporary Sounds of Nicholas, Vol. 1 – Nicholas
 1993 – The Storyteller – Vinx
 1994 – D2: The Mighty Ducks – Original Soundtrack
 1994 – On & On: The Hits of Stephen Bishop – Stephen Bishop
 1994 – A Tribute to Curtis Mayfield [Warner Bros.] – VVAA
 1994 – Corrina Corrina Original Soundtrack
 1994 – Emperors of Soul – The Temptations
 1995 – Faith – Lords of the Underground

References

External links
Official website
Nate Watts Interview NAMM Oral History Library (2019)

1954 births
Living people
American male bass guitarists
American session musicians
American rhythm and blues bass guitarists
African-American guitarists
American funk bass guitarists
American rock bass guitarists
Guitarists from Detroit
20th-century American bass guitarists
20th-century American male musicians
20th-century African-American musicians
21st-century African-American people